Hermann Felsner (1 April 1889 – 6 February 1977) also known as Ermanno Fellsner, was an Austrian football player and manager.

Playing career
Born in Vienna, Felsner competed with the Wiener Sportclub, before moving to Italy to play for and manage many clubs.

Managerial career
Although he managed several clubs, Hermann is most remembered for his time at Bologna with whom he spent over a decade and led the club to four Italian League titles. In the club's entire history they have won seven scudetti, making Felsner their most successful manager.

He also won the Coppa Italia once, with Genoa in 1937.

Honours

Managerial
 Italian Football Championship: 1925, 1929
 Serie A: 1939, 1941
 Coppa Italia: 1937

References

1889 births
1977 deaths
Austrian footballers
Footballers from Vienna
Association football midfielders
Austrian football managers
Serie A managers
A.C. Milan managers
ACF Fiorentina managers
Austrian expatriate football managers
Austrian expatriate sportspeople in Italy
Expatriate football managers in Italy